Dusan Licina (born in 1986 in Belgrade, Serbia) is an engineer and researcher specializing in indoor air quality, building ventilation, and human exposure. He is a professor at EPFL (École Polytechnique Fédérale de Lausanne) and head of the Human-Oriented Built Environment Laboratory.

Early life and education 
Licina received a B.Sc. in 2008 and a M.Sc. in 2010 in Mechanical Engineering from the University of Belgrade. During this time, he specialized in studying heating, ventilation, and air-Conditioning (HVAC) systems. In 2015, he received a joint Ph.D. from the National University of Singapore (School of Design and Environment) and the Technical University of Denmark (International Centre for Indoor Environment and Energy). His Ph.D. thesis, titled "Human convective boundary layer and its impact on personal exposure," contributed to the improved understanding of airflow characteristics around the human body, personal exposure to airborne pollutants indoors, and ventilation control.

Career
Upon completing his Ph.D., Licina moved to the University of California, Berkeley as a postdoctoral researcher in the group of William W. Nazaroff. During his postdoctoral career, Licina focused on investigating sources and transport of air pollutants in buildings and inhalation exposure assessment. He then served as the director of the standard development team at the International WELL Building Institute (IWBI) in New York. During this time, he led the development of the air and thermal comfort concepts within the WELL v2 green building certification standard, a global standard for healthy buildings in more than 65 countries.

Licina joined EPFL in June 2018 as a tenure-track assistant professor of indoor environmental quality at the School for Architecture, Civil, and Environmental Engineering (ENAC), and has since served as director of the Human-Oriented Built Environment Laboratory at EPFL, also part of the Smart Living Lab and located in Fribourg.

Research
Some of Licina’s notable research contributions include understanding of contributions of human skin and clothing to the concentration and diversity of indoor chemicals and particulate matter, including bioaerosols, and their contribution to indoor inhalation burden.

Recognition 
In 2022, Licina received the Yaglou Award granted by the International Society of Indoor Air Quality and Climate (ISIAQ) at the Indoor Air 2022 conference.

Licina is the recipient of the Ralph G. Nevins award by the American Society of Heating, Refrigerating and Air-Conditioning Engineers (ASHRAE). His research group's work yielded three conference awards at the Healthy Building 2021. He is an editorial board member of the Indoor Air and Atmosphere journals.

He has frequently appeared in media outlets, for example, during the COVID-19 pandemic as an expert on airborne pathogen transmission mechanisms on the Swiss television RTS, in the Swiss newspaper 20 min, on the new portal Heidi.News, and on matters related to indoor air quality in Mirage News and Tech Explorist. He also gave a lecture on the April 2021 workshop series organized by the US National Academy of Sciences on the state-of-the-science on exposure to PM2.5 indoors, its health impacts and engineering approaches, and interventions to reduce exposure risks, including practical mitigation solutions in residential settings.

Selected works

References

External links 
 
 Website of the HOBEL laboratory.

1986 births
Living people
Serbian academics
École Polytechnique Fédérale de Lausanne
Academic staff of the École Polytechnique Fédérale de Lausanne
University of Belgrade alumni